Henry Louis Charles Albert, Prince of Nassau-Saarbrücken (9 March 1768 in Saarbrücken – 27 April 1797 near Cadolzburg), was a titular prince of Nassau-Saarbrücken.  He never actually reigned, because the country was occupied by French revolutionary  troops from 1793 until after his death.

Life 
He was the son of Louis, Prince of Nassau-Saarbrücken and his first wife, Princess Wilhelmine of Schwarzburg-Rudolstadt  (1751–1780).  His parents' marriage was unhappy, so that Wihelmine retreated to Hallberg Castle, where she raised her son.

He studied physics, first in Strasbourg and from 1782 to 1785 in Göttingen.  Then he went on his Grand Tour.  In 1786, he was in Berlin and in the spring of 1787 in Italy.

On 14 May 1793 he had to flee when French troop attacked Neunkirchen castle.  He entered Prussian military service.  He had to watch when his ancestral castle went up in flames in October 1793.  On 14 November 1793, he was promoted to colonel in the Prussian cavalry.

In 1794 his father died and he inherited the title of Prince.  However, Nassau-Saarbrücken was still occupied by French revolutionary troops and he could not rule his principality.

In 1797 he died after a fall from a horse.  Since he had no descendants, Nassau-Saarbrücken fell to his first cousin once removed, Prince Charles William of Nassau-Usingen (his father's first cousin). His half brother Adolph came of age in 1805 and resumed the title Prince of Nassau-Saarbrücken.

Marriage 
He married on 6 October 1785 to Princess Marie Françoise Maximilienne of Saint Mauris-Montbarrey (2 November 1761 – 2 February 1838), the daughter of Prince Alexandre Marie Léonor de Saint-Mauris de Montbarrey. They left no issue.

Ancestors

References 
 
 Genealogisch-historisch-statistischer Almanach, p. 108 Online

External links 
 
 Biography of Henry Louis

Footnotes 

Princes of Nassau
People from Saarbrücken
House of Nassau
Prussian Army personnel
1768 births
1797 deaths
18th-century German people
German military personnel of the French Revolutionary Wars
Military personnel from Saarland